Western Avenue is a major four-lane street in the city of Los Angeles (west of Downtown) and through the center portion of Los Angeles County, California. It is one of the longest north–south streets in Los Angeles city and county, apart from Sepulveda Boulevard.

Description
Western Avenue passes through a large diversity of residential neighborhoods in Los Angeles County. From the south, where it transitions into Paseo Del Mar near White Point and the Pacific Ocean, it begins in San Pedro, then passes through Rancho Palos Verdes, Harbor City, Gardena and South Los Angeles. It is also the easternmost border of Torrance.

Around the Pico Boulevard, Olympic Boulevard, and Wilshire Boulevard intersections, Western Avenue passes through Koreatown. Further north, Western Avenue passes through the East Hollywood district. Around the Santa Monica Boulevard, Sunset Boulevard, and Hollywood Boulevard intersections, it passes through the East Hollywood neighborhoods of Little Armenia and Thai Town.

The northern terminus of Western is north of Franklin Avenue in the Los Feliz district, at the base of the Hollywood Hills. The road curves east becoming Los Feliz Boulevard, a major east/west thoroughfare through Los Feliz to the Golden State Freeway and from there into the city of Glendale.

Another Western Avenue begins north of Griffith Park and is located in the San Fernando Valley area of Glendale. Its southwest terminus is nearly due north of where Los Angeles' Western Avenue transitions into Los Feliz Boulevard.

California State Route 213 is designated as the portion of Western Avenue from Interstate 405 to 25th Street, in San Pedro.

California State Route 258 is designated as the portion of Western Avenue from Interstate 405 to the Hollywood Freeway US 101.

History
The street derives its name from its history as the westernmost border of Los Angeles city limits in the 19th century, before annexations in the early 20th century expanded the city westward and onwards.

In 1923, Alejandro Borquez opened the Sonora Cafe on Western. The café, which in 1927 changed its name to El Cholo Spanish Cafe,
is credited with the invention of the burrito.

Public transit

Metro subway and at-grade stations
Western Avenue is served by three Los Angeles Metro Rail stations: 
Hollywood Boulevard on the B Line
Wilshire Boulevard on the D Line
Exposition Boulevard on the E Line

Metro Local
Metro Local lines 205 and 207, and Gardena Transit line 2 operate on Western Avenue.
Metro local line 207 runs between Hollywood Boulevard and Imperial Highway.
Gardena Line 2 runs between Imperial Highway and Pacific Coast Highway
Metro line 205 runs between Pacific Coast Highway and 1st Street in San Pedro.

References

External links
 YouTube: Western Avenue (Melrose to Pico) Los Angeles
 Western Ave (Los Angeles) (Daytime, April 2020)
 Western Ave (Los Angeles) (Nighttime, November 2020)

Streets in Los Angeles
Streets in Los Angeles County, California
Central Los Angeles
East Hollywood, Los Angeles
Lomita, California
South Los Angeles
Red-light districts in California